Voyagin is a tour and activity online booking platform headquartered in Tokyo. The company was founded in 2011 as FindJPN, and rebranded as Voyagin in 2012 by co-founders Masashi Takahashi, Tushar Khandelwal and Hiroyuki Hayashi.

In July 2015, Rakuten announced it acquired a majority stake in Voyagin to expand its travel market in Asia. Rakuten absorbed Voyagin on July 1, 2020, while retaining the Voyagin name and website. In December 2021, the company changed its name to Rakuten Travel Experiences and relaunched with a new website.

Business 
Voyagin is a travel activities marketplace that enables travelers and locals to book tickets and tours in Asia and parts of Europe and the US.

History 
The company was founded in January 2011 originally under the name of FindJPN by Masashi Takahashi and Hiroyuki Hayashi. Tushar Khandelwal came on board in 2012 and they relaunched the brand as Voyagin, a more global approach to booking tours and activities. It started as part of Open Network Lab, a Japanese incubator, and then raised seed funding from Digital Garage and other investors in 2012.

They then raised a second round of funding of $500,000 in 2014, led by Singapore National Research Foundation and Jungle Ventures.

On July 2, 2015, Rakuten announced their majority-stake acquisition of Voyagin after 6 months of talks, for an undisclosed figure, with the aim to expand their market share of the Asia travel industry.

On April 20, 2020, Rakuten announced the decision to merge Voyagin into Rakuten. The absorption-type merger was completed on July 1, 2020.

On December 23, 2021, the company changed its name to Rakuten Travel Experiences and launched a new website at https://experiences.travel.rakuten.com/.

References

External links 
 Official website
Rakuten Travel Experiences

2011 establishments in Japan
Transport companies established in 2011
Internet properties established in 2011
Online companies of Japan
Online travel agencies
Rakuten
2015 mergers and acquisitions
Multilingual websites
Companies based in Tokyo
Service companies based in Tokyo
Travel and holiday companies of Japan